White Eyes Creek is a stream located entirely within Muskingum County, Ohio.

White Eyes Creek was named for White Eyes, a Delaware Indian chief.

See also
List of rivers of Ohio

References

Rivers of Muskingum County, Ohio
Rivers of Ohio